Shanahoe GAA is a Gaelic Athletic Association hurling and gaelic football  club in the village of Shanahoe, County Laois, Ireland, whose pitches are located about 2 km outside the village.

History
The current club was founded as recently as 1980 and is located in the parish of Raheen, County Laois and amalgamates with St Fintan's, Colt to play underage football and hurling although there is still a very strong sense of rivalry between the two clubs. An older Shanahoe hurling club won the Laois Intermediate Hurling Championship back in 1951, having won the Laois Junior Hurling Championship three years previously.

In 1999, the current Shanahoe club enjoyed its most memorable day when Declan Cuddy captained them to a 4-7 to 0-6 win over Ballypickas in the Laois Junior Hurling Championship final. Football is very much a secondary sport in the club but in 2005 Shanahoe won the All-County Football League Division 5 title and also reached the Laois Junior C Football Championship final. The club colours are red and black.

Achievements
 Laois Intermediate Hurling Championship Winners 1951
 Laois Junior Hurling Championship: Winners 1948, 1999
 Laois All-County Football League Div. 5: (1) 2005

References

External links
 Shanahoe GAA Official Website
 Laoistalk - Laois GAA News Website

Gaelic games clubs in County Laois
Hurling clubs in County Laois
Gaelic football clubs in County Laois